Zhuo Li-ping (born 29 September 1999) is a Taiwanese footballer who plays as a defender for Taiwan Mulan Football League club Hualien FC and the Chinese Taipei women's national team.

International career
Zhuo represented Chinese Taipei at the 2013 AFC U-14 Girls' Regional Championship, the 2015 AFC U-16 Women's Championship and the 2017 AFC U-19 Women's Championship. She was capped at senior level during the 2018 Asian Games, the 2019 EAFF E-1 Football Championship and the 2020 AFC Women's Olympic Qualifying Tournament.

International goals

References

1999 births
Living people
Women's association football defenders
Taiwanese women's footballers
Chinese Taipei women's international footballers
Asian Games competitors for Chinese Taipei
Footballers at the 2018 Asian Games